Difluorophosphate or difluorodioxophosphate or phosphorodifluoridate  is an anion with formula . It has a single negative charge and resembles perchlorate and monofluorosulfonate (SO3F−) in shape and compounds. These ions are isoelectronic, along with tetrafluoroaluminate, phosphate, orthosilicate, and sulfate.   It forms a series of compounds.  The ion is toxic to mammals as it causes blockage to iodine uptake in the thyroid. However it is degraded in the body over several hours.

Compounds containing difluorophosphate may have it as a simple uninegative ion, it may function as a difluorophosphato ligand where it is covalently bound to one or two metal atoms, or go on to form a networked solid. It may be covalently bound to a non metal or an organic moiety to make an ester or an amide.

Formation
The ammonium salt of difluorophosphate is formed from treating phosphorus pentoxide with ammonium fluoride. This was how the ion was first made by its discoverer, Willy Lange, in 1929.

Alkali chlorides can react with dry difluorophosphoric acid to form alkali metal salts.
NaCl + HPO2F2 → NaPO2F2 + HCl()

Fluoridation of dichlorophosphates can produce difluorophosphates. Another method is fluorination of phosphates or polyphosphates.

Trimethylsilyl difluorophosphate reacts with metal chlorides to give difluorophosphates.

The anhydride phosphoryl difluoride oxide (P2O3F4) reacts with oxides such as UO3 to yield difuorophosphates. Phosphoryl difluoride oxide also reacts with alkali fluorides to yield difluorophosphates.

Properties
In ammonium difluorophosphate the difluorophosphate ion has these interatomic dimensions: P–O length 1.457 Å, P–F length 1.541 Å, O–P–O angle 118.7°, F–P–O 109.4° and F–P–F angle 98.6°. Hydrogen bonding from ammonium to oxygen atoms causes a change to the difluorophosphate ion in the ammonium salt. In potassium difluorophosphate the ion has dimensions: P–O length 1.470 Å, P–F length 1.575 Å, O–P–O angle 122.4°, F–P–O 108.6° and F–P–F angle 97.1°.

On heating the salts that are not of alkali or alkaline earths, difluorophosphates decompose firstly by giving off POF3 forming a monofluorophosphate (PO3F2−) compound, and then this in turn decomposes to an orthophosphate  compound.

Difluorophosphate salts are normally soluble and stable in water.  However, in acidic or alkaline conditions they can be hydrolyzed to monofluorophosphates and hydrofluoric acid. The caesium and potassium salts are the least soluble.

Compounds

Related substances

Difluorphosphoric acid
Difluorphosphoric acid (HPO2F2) is one of the fluorophosphoric acids.  It is produced when phosphoryl fluoride reacts with water:
POF3 + H2O → HPO2F2 + HF
This in turn is hydrolysed more to give monofluorophosphoric acid (H2PO3F), and a trace of hexafluorophosphoric acid (HPF6). HPO2F2 also is produced when HF reacts with phosphorus pentoxide. Yet another method involves making difluorphosphoric acid as a side product of calcium fluoride being heated with damp phosphorus pentoxide. A method to make pure difluorphosphoric acid involves heating phosphoryl fluoride with monofluorophosphoric acid and separating the product by distillation:
POF3 + H2PO3F → 2HPO2F2

Difluorophosphoric acid can also be produced by fluorinating phosphorus oxychlorides. P2O3Cl4 and POCl3 react with hydrogen fluoride solution to yield HPO2Cl2 and then HPO2F2. Yet another way is to treat orthophosphate with fluorosulfuric acid (HSO3F).

Difluorphosphoric acid melts at −96.5 °C and boils at 115.9 °C.  Its density at 25 °C is 1.583 g/cm3.

Phosphoryl difluoride oxide
Difluorophosphoric acid anhydride also known as phosphoryl difluoride oxide or diphosphoryl tetrafluoride (F2OPOPOF2 or P2O3F4) is an anhydride of difluorphosphoric acid. It crystallises in the orthorhombic system, with space group Pcca and Z = 4. P2O3F4 can be made by refluxing difluorophosphoric acid with phosphorus pentoxide. P2O3F4 boils at 71 °C.

Substitution
In addition to the isoelectronic series, ions related by substituting fluorine or oxygen by other elements include monofluorophosphate, difluorothiophosphate, dichlorothiophosphate,  dichlorophosphate, chlorofluorothiophosphate, chlorofluorophosphate, dibromophosphate, and bromofluorophosphate.

Adducts
Difluorophosphate can form adducts with PF5 and AsF5. In these the oxygen atoms form a donor-acceptor link between the P and As (or P) atoms, linking the difluorides to the pentafluorides. Example salts include KPO2F2 · 2AsF5, KPO2F2·AsF5, KPO2F2 · 2PF5 and KPO2F2 · PF5.

Amines can react with phosphoryl fluoride to make substances with a formula RR′N–POF2.  The amines shown to do this include ethylamine, isopropylamine, n-butylamine, t-butylamine, dimethylamine, and diethylamine. The monoamines can further react to yield an alkyliminophosphoric fluoride (RN=POF).

References

Phosphorus oxyanions
Fluorophosphates
Anions